is a passenger railway station in located in the city of Yokkaichi,  Mie Prefecture, Japan, operated by the private railway operator Kintetsu Railway.

Lines
Nakagawara Station is served by the Yunoyama Line, and is located 1.7 rail kilometers from the terminus of the line at Kintetsu-Yokkaichi Station.

Station layout
The station consists of two opposed side platforms, connected by a level crossing.

Platforms

Adjacent stations

History
The station was opened on September 24, 1913 as a passenger station on the Yokkaichi Railway. On March 1, 1931 it fell under the ownership of Mie Railway following a merger. The station was transferred to  Sanco following a merger in February 11, 1944. On February 1, 1964 the railway division of Sanco split off to form a separate company and the station came under the control of the Mie Electric Railway, which merged with Kintetsu on April 1, 1965.

Passenger statistics
In fiscal 2019, the station was used by an average of 1147 passengers daily (boarding passengers only).

Surrounding area
Toyobo Mie Factory
Yokkaichi Nakagawara Post Office
Yokkaichi Municipal Hospital

See also
List of railway stations in Japan

References

External links

 Kintetsu: Nakagawara Station

Railway stations in Japan opened in 1913
Railway stations in Mie Prefecture
Yokkaichi